Tea at Five is a 2002 one-woman play, written by Matthew Lombardo, which tells the story of Katharine Hepburn in a monologue. It is based on Hepburn's book Me: Stories of My Life. The play starred Kate Mulgrew, and was apparently written with her in mind for the part.

Mulgrew is something of a Hepburn lookalike, and has been frequently compared to Hepburn, a comparison she has said in interview she found "odious." Mulgrew was not a fan of Hepburn before studying for the part, but apparently came to greatly appreciate Hepburn while researching the role.

Plot
Tea at Five is an intimate look at Katharine Hepburn at home in her Fenwick estate in Old Saybrook, Connecticut.

The first act takes place in September 1938. Despite Broadway appearances and her first Oscar, she has just been labeled "box office poison" after a series of film flops. With her professional future in doubt, she contemplates her childhood in Hartford, education and her start in show business.

The second act takes place in February 1983, after Hepburn was injured in a car crash. The accident affords the now-legendary star an opportunity to reflect on the triumphs of her career and her heart-breaking romance with Spencer Tracy.

Origin/ Productions
Aspiring playwright Matthew Lombardo was watching the television program Star Trek: Voyager with his friend actress Nancy Addison who appeared on Ryan's Hope the soap opera for which Lombardo was at the time a staff writer. Seeing Kate Mulgrew in the lead role of Captain Kathryn Janeway, (Matthew Lombardo quote:) "I said: 'My god, she looks like Katharine Hepburn! Someone should write a play for her!' Nancy said: "You’re a playwright, you idiot, write it and I’ll get it to her.' So I did."

Kate Mulgrew originated the role of Katharine Hepburn at Hartford Stage in 2002, and remained with the show through productions at Cleveland Play House, American Repertory Theatre (Cambridge, MA), Promenade Theatre (New York), Cuillo Center for the Arts (West Palm Beach, FL), Orpheum Theatre (Phoenix, AZ), The Buschnell Belding Theatre (Hartford, CT), The Shubert Theatre (Boston), Hippodrome Theatre (Baltimore), Seattle Repertory Theatre, Marines Memorial Theatre (San Francisco), and Pasadena Playhouse.

An audiobook production of Tea at Five is available on CD, released in September 2004. The script is published by Samuel French.

A tour starred four-time Tony Award Nominee Tovah Feldshuh, opening at the Northshore Center for the Performing Arts in Skokie, IL and then playing the Parker Playhouse in Ft. Lauderdale, FL on January 9 through 13, 2008.

A professionally licensed production took place at the Stratford-upon-Avon Fringe Festival (UK) from Saturday 2–9 June 2012 starring Meg Lloyd as Katharine Hepburn, Directed by Christopher Wraysford and produced by Indefatigable Productions where it won awards for Best Solo Production and Best Female Actor and was also nominated for Best Director. The same production moved to The Old Joint Stock Theatre in Birmingham (UK) for performances on 14 & 15 September 2012.

This production was also performed at the Edinburgh Fringe Festival in August 2013, co-directed by Richard Bunn and Rebecca Phillips and starring Meg Lloyd. 

It was announced in December 2018 that Faye Dunaway would headline a 2019 Broadway production of Tea at Five, which would return the actress to Broadway some thirty-seven years after her sole Broadway lead role in the 1982 flop The Curse of an Aching Heart, itself Dunaway's first New York stage engagement in sixteen years. Revamped by playwright Matthew Lombardo into a seventy minute single act focused on Katharine Hepburn at age 75, and helmed by the premiere production's director John Tillinger, Tea at Five played at the Huntington Avenue Theatre in Boston  22 June-14 July 2019 engagement headlined by Dunaway. Subsequent to this purportedly Broadway tryout engagement there were reports that the play's producers had fired Dunaway for unprofessional backstage behaviour, although Tea at Five'''s Boston engagement had not been an audience draw and had received mixed reviews which would not have encouraged a Broadway transfer. The producers' issued a statement that "plans are in development for the play to have its West End debut early next year with a new actress to play the role of Katharine Hepburn", but this did not eventuate.

Other actors to star in Tea at Five'' include Stephanie Zimbalist and Charles Busch.

References

2002 plays
American plays
Biographical plays about actors
Plays set in the 1930s
Plays set in the 1980s
Plays based on real people
Monodrama
Plays set in Connecticut
Plays for one performer
Fiction set in 1938
Fiction set in 1983
Cultural depictions of Katharine Hepburn